The Sasaki metric is a natural choice of Riemannian metric on the tangent bundle of a Riemannian manifold.
Introduced by Shigeo Sasaki in 1958.

Construction

The map  is a Riemannian submersion.
For the Sasaki metric, we have for any ; that is, the curve  normally crosses the tangent spaces .

References
S. Sasaki, On the differential geometry of tangent bundle of Riemannian manifolds, Tôhoku Math. J.,10 (1958), 338–354.

Riemannian manifolds